Manuel Póvoa dos Reis  (20 October 1907 – 4 June 1991) was a Portuguese botanist, phycologist and Roman Catholic priest.

Career
Póvoa dos Reis ordained priest in 1936, in Coimbra, Portugal, and nominated canon of the Cathedral of Coimbra in 1957. In addition to his religious work, Póvoa dos reis maintained an interest in botany, resulting in him being nominated a member of the Broterian Society in 1943, an assistant of the Faculty of Sciences of the University of Coimbra in 1956, and a member of the New York Academy of Sciences. His research focused on freshwater red algae, particularly in the family Batrachospermaceae.

References

1907 births
People from Aveiro, Portugal
1991 deaths
20th-century Portuguese botanists